The music of Eswatini is composed of both ethnic Swazi music and varieties of folk music as well as modern genres such as rock, pop and hip hop, which has been popular in Eswatini since headed by bands such as Vamoose. The popularity of hip hop in South Africa, which shares a border with Eswatini, has also helped popularize it.

Two major festivals in the country are Incwala and Umhlanga. The former takes place in December while the latter takes place in August. Umhlanga is known for its dance, performed exclusively by women, and its 5-day ceremony, which involves reed-cutting. Traditional instruments used include: the kudu horn, calabash, rattles, makeyana and reed flute.

See also
 Ethnic Swazi music
 Mine bengidzakiwe
 Nkulunkulu Mnikati wetibusiso temaSwati, the national anthem of Eswatini

References